John Bellenden ( 1533–1587) was a Scottish writer.

John Bellenden may also refer to:

 Sir John Bellenden of Auchnole and Broughton (died 1576), Lord Justice Clerk
 John Bellenden Ker Gawler (1764–1842), English botanist

See also
 John Ballenden ( 18121856), Scottish fur trader